Bror Karl Fock (29 March 1888 – 4 September 1964) was a Swedish long-distance runner who competed at the 1912 Summer Olympics held in Stockholm in the 3000 m, 10000 m and cross-country events. He finished seventh in the 3000 m, earning a silver medal with the Swedish team, and 17th in the cross country race. Although Sweden won the cross-country team event, Fock did not receive a medal because only three best runners from each team were counted, while he was seventh.

In 1912, Fock briefly held the world record over 3000 m. He won the national 10000 m title in 1909, 1910 and 1912, placing second in 1911 and 1913.

References

1888 births
1964 deaths
Swedish male long-distance runners
Olympic silver medalists for Sweden
Athletes (track and field) at the 1912 Summer Olympics
Olympic athletes of Sweden
World record setters in athletics (track and field)
Medalists at the 1912 Summer Olympics
Olympic silver medalists in athletics (track and field)
Olympic cross country runners
People from Vänersborg Municipality
Sportspeople from Västra Götaland County